Avraham Tamir (9 November 192420 December 2010), also known as Avrasha Tamir, was an Israeli soldier and statesman. Born in the Mandate of Palestine, Tamir joined the British Army as part of the Jewish Brigade, serving in World War II, and became a commanding officer in the Haganah. This gave him a command in the Israel-Palestine war, where he defended the Etzion bloc during the Kfar Etzion massacre, ultimately being captured wounded. When Israel was founded, he joined the Israel Defense Forces, rising to the rank of major general (Aluf). During his time with the IDF he served in the Yom Kippur War and 1982 Lebanon War  as well as several Cold War conflicts in the Middle East. Specialising in national security and military strategy, after his military career he became an advisor to leading Israeli politicians, and contributed to the Camp David Accords.

Early and personal life
Avraham Tamir was born on 9 November 1924 in Tel Aviv, Mandatory Palestine, as Avraham Treinin (Avraam Trainin). Tamir's father was Russian from Harbin, Manchuria, and left the Far East in 1913 when his father sent him to study medicine in Italy; instead of going to Italy he joined pioneers and settled in the Holy Land. Tamir's brothers were the poet Avner Treinin and the Mapai legal counsel Ze'ev Treinin. Tamir chose to Hebraize his name (to Tamir), inspired to do so by David Ben-Gurion, who encouraged members of the Israel Defense Forces (IDF) to take Hebrew names.

He was married to Varda Agron(sky), daughter of Gershon Agron, and they had three children: daughters Michal and Daphna and son Gideon. All three became scholars: Michal (Shany, b. 1950) in special education at the University of Haifa, Daphna (Efrat, b. 1955) in Islamic studies at the Open University of Israel, and Gideon as principal of the Talmud Torah school in Beit She'an. Gideon had started following Breslov and studied at a kollel in Safed. Daphna married musician ; their son is the actor and translator Daniel Efrat.

Tamir later married  (b. 1950), a model who in 1969 was the runner-up Miss Israel and a top 15 finisher of Miss World. They had two children, Roi (b. 1987) and Neta.

Military career

British Army and Haganah
In the British Mandate of Palestine, Tamir was a senior member of the Haganah and also served with the British Army. He joined the IDF upon its founding, serving in the 1948 Israel-Palestine war (also known as the Israel War of Independence).

In World War II, Tamir signed up for the Jewish Brigade, fighting in Italy. Around the time of the Israel-Palestine War, he was the CO of a Haganah battalion.

At the time of the Gush Etzion Convoys in 1947, Tamir was stationed in Gush Etzion as part of a squad leaders course. He held his first command there, in charge of a reprisal attack on Arabs following the Convoy of Ten. The attack was unsuccessful, and Tamir had predicted this, later saying: "There was no chance of doing real damage because we hadn't set up a roadblock and were too far away. Those were our orders." During the Israel-Palestine war, Tamir was severely injured in the battle at Gush Etzion, and a bullet that became lodged inside his body was never removed. He was the last commander left defending Gush Etzion during the siege, as Moshe Silberschmidt's deputy, ultimately being captured by Jordanians of the Arab Legion. He was held as a prisoner of war until February 1949, when a prisoner exchange was arranged and the injured Tamir was taken with another Jewish soldier to the Hadassah Medical Center; the other soldier reported that Tamir was "elated all the way". In 1950, under a Ben-Gurion policy to prevent Arab refugees in Jordan from returning, Tamir commanded an attack demolishing all abandoned villages that had not yet been settled by Israelis.

While recovering from his capture and injuries, Tamir wrote a book about his experiences at Etzion, Witness to Battle, which was published in 1949.

Israel Defense Forces

Tamir was given command of an infantry battalion following the foundation of Israel. He led the IDF Staff and Command College (1962–1965) and is said to have personally written much of the training material for the IDF. In his early IDF career, in the 1950s, Tamir became friends with Ariel Sharon and Yitzhak Rabin. In the late 1950s, Tamir served under Rabin when he was the head of the operations department of the General Staff, and Tamir and Sharon served together in the Yom Kippur War in October 1973. His final war in the IDF was the 1982 Lebanon War.

At the start of the Suez Crisis (also known as the Sinai War), Tamir was the operations chief in IDF Central Command. A 2018 Haaretz article reported that, based on newly-revealed testimonies, Tamir was "the architect" of the plans that lead to the Kafr Qasim massacre, by way of Operation Mole: a plan, requested by Ben-Gurion, to exile Arabs of the Triangle into Jordan or imprison them in concentration camps away from the border. The article quotes Tamir as having written: "The plans were more or less mine... To put it simply, if war broke out, whoever did not flee to Jordan would be evacuated to concentration camps in the rear; they wouldn't stay on the border."

In the Six-Day War, Tamir was commander of the 99th "Negev" Brigade. He and Amos Horev accompanied Shlomo Goren to Bethlehem to search for the Tomb of Rachel on his mission to capture holy sites. Goren found Rachel's tomb after Tamir and Horev travelled on to Gush Etzion and Hebron. Reuniting in Hebron, the pair then helped Goren to break the gates at the Cave of the Patriarchs; inside the temple the three were told that the mayor wished to surrender, and left for the town hall.

Prior to the Yom Kippur War, a surprise attack on Israel (which assumed that after the Six-Day War their neighbors would not invade), Tamir and the planning branch of the IDF he led had warned that the Arabs had significant antitank missiles. Despite this, tank-based counterattacks were launched in the early days of the war, leading to incidents like the Valley of Tears. Following the Yom Kippur War, "he became involved in making peace".

In December 1973, Tamir was promoted from brigadier general to major general (Aluf) to head up the new planning division, which would assess and create strategy and doctrine. Though the IDF had agreed to form the department for some time, it came as a result of the Yom Kippur War.

National security and military strategy appointments

When he was a colonel, in 1966, Tamir was approached by prime minister Levi Eshkol to help develop Israeli doctrine on nuclear weapons, which Eshkol himself dubbed the Samson Option. Tamir said that two incentives for a nuclear program arose in these early discussions: "national insurance policy" (to encourage the United States to continue arming Israel so that, though they had it, they would not have to use nuclear) and "national safety valve" (last resort contingency). Historian Shlomo Aronson described Israeli nuclear policy as "the Tamir school", based on Tamir's influence; Israeli leaders had been worried of Muslim nuclear development since the 1950s, but these fears intensified under Tamir, creating "the need to reach an accord on the territories before a Muslim state develops a nuclear capability."

In the 1970s, Tamir became a commander of the IDF's planning division and of national security. First, in 1970, he became assistant head of the branch of the General Staff in charge of planning. He then helped to create the specific strategy and security branches. In 1974, he founded the IDF Strategic and Policy Planning Branch, at the end of the Yom Kippur War, and served as its head. Later in the 1970s he was the driving force for Ezer Weizman to create the National Security Unit, becoming its first director. In 1981, Tamir became the head of national security of the Ministry of Defense under Ariel Sharon.

During his time in these roles, he worked under six different defense ministers: Moshe Dayan, Shimon Peres, Weizman, Menachem Begin, Sharon and Moshe Arens. He also ventured into political advising, becoming head of military planning during Menachem Begin's premiership. He helped create security policy and negotiate peace deals among nations; he was Weizman's senior aide at Camp David in 1978 for the Camp David Accords. Helping to negotiate the agreements, Tamir pushed for "consideration of Palestinian autonomy" in the Accords, while Weizman said that Tamir was instrumental in "keeping the negotiations on track":

In response to retroactive criticism of peace between Israel and Egypt, Tamir said in 1984: "If you think back to the separation of forces agreement, you will recall that no blood has been spilled on the sands of Sinai since 1974. The same also applies to the Syrians; they have honoured their agreement as well."

Political career

Roles
Tamir resigned from the military in April 1984; Moshe Arens, who became Defense Minister in 1983, had decided to reassign Tamir, prompting his decision to leave. As a civilian he drafted the platform of Weizman's new political party Yahad; he did not plan to become a professional politician, and did not run for the Knesset. In this year, he described Weizman's 1980 resignation from the eighteenth government of Israel as "remarkable", saying: "Which other defence minister ever quit over principles! If Ezer had been like all the rest he would have stayed on, and today could have easily been the major candidate for prime minister."

Though he did not enter the Knesset, Tamir stayed in political life; he first became the director-general of the Prime Minister's Office under Peres. He also served as Peres's national security advisor. When Peres became Foreign Minister, Tamir became director-general of the Foreign Ministry, serving until 1988. Peres and Tamir collaborated, but the nominations were "forced upon Peres" by Weizman, an ally after the integration of Yahad into Labor, and Tamir's political mentor.

Peres, Weizman, and Tamir worked together in Arab affairs. In January 1985, Tamir created and led a committee on Arab Israeli affairs. His efficiency in administration gave Weizman a reason to fire a political rival by abolishing the previous Arab affairs advisor role, though this created tensions with the Arab population. Weizman gave the responsibilities back to a larger advisor role, placing Joseph Ginat in it; Ginat, Yitzhak Reiter, and Tamir drafted a policy that would reach a compromise on loyalty and identity for Arab Israelis, particularly making military service voluntary.

In 1985, pursuing peace with Hussein of Jordan, Peres proposed to him throwing out previous talks of two decades and discussing a radical new plan. In the secret meetings between the leaders, Peres was accompanied by Tamir, who came highly recommended by Weizman in such negotiating; also esteemed by Peres, Tamir was the exception to the secretive air and invited to join the negotiations between Peres and Hussein.

In his Foreign Ministry role, Tamir held talks in 1987 with Alexander Belonogov, the USSR's ambassador to the UN, regarding improving relations between the two nations, particularly on the matter of Russian Jews being allowed to emigrate to Israel. In 1993, he was named special assistant to president Weizman.

Views on Palestine
Tamir long supported some form of an independent Palestinian state, and was "one of the first Israeli officials" to meet with Yasser Arafat. He was disappointed in the Oslo Accords and with Peres; he publicly supported Benjamin Netanyahu for election in 1996, but was also disappointed in his process. In 1988 he wrote that he believed the best solution for Israel and Palestine's territorial conflict was to form a confederation.

Though the Israeli government was averse to talks with the Palestine Liberation Organization (PLO), when Tamir was attached to the Foreign Ministry, he requested what is the first known contact between an Israeli official and the PLO leadership in September 1986. The meeting of Tamir and Arafat took place in Mozambique after Peres consented to requesting facilitation from the PLO in Europe and an Israeli advisor who was connected to Mozambique. Also present in Mozambique were the Israeli ambassador to Botswana, who attended but did not contribute, and Abu Jihad of the Palestinian Fatah, who did not attend. In a 1999 interview with Ze'ev Schiff, Tamir said that he and Arafat discussed Israel's views on peace and national security. Though little progress was made from their meeting, it paved the way for subsequent discussions.

Decorations

On 5 September 1978, while at Camp David with Jimmy Carter and the Israeli delegation, Tamir wore military decorations in a similar layout; the Aluf rank was worn on his epaulet, and the Decoration of State Warriors clasp was mounted on his War of Independence Ribbon.

Death and legacy
He died on 20 December 2010 in Tel Aviv. He had a military funeral the next day at Kiryat Shaul Cemetery, with an honor guard of six major generals.

The Center for Israel Education described Tamir as "a military strategic mastermind". A review for his autobiographical military strategy book, A Soldier in Search of Peace, published in International Affairs, said:

Bibliography

Notes

References

1924 births
2010 deaths
Burials at Kiryat Shaul Cemetery
Haganah members
Israeli people of Russian-Jewish descent
Jewish Brigade personnel
People from Tel Aviv
Israeli generals
Israeli people wounded in the 1947–1949 Palestine war
Israeli people of the Six-Day War
Israeli people of the Yom Kippur War